Gadodiamide, sold under the brand name Omniscan, is a gadolinium-based MRI contrast agent (GBCA), used in magnetic resonance imaging (MRI) procedures to assist in the visualization of blood vessels.

Medical uses 

Gadodiamide is a contrast medium used for cranial and spinal magnetic resonance imaging (MRI) and for general MRI of the body after intravenous administration. It provides contrast enhancement and facilitates visualisation of abnormal structures or lesions in various parts of the body including the central nervous system (CNS). It crosses intact the blood brain barrier.

Adverse effects 
It is one of the main GBCA associated with nephrogenic systemic fibrosis (NSF), a toxic reaction occurring in some people with kidney problems. No cases have been seen in people with normal kidney function.

A 2015 study found gadolinium deposited in the brain tissue of people who had received gadodiamide.  Other studies using post-mortem mass spectrometry found most of the deposit remained at least 2 years after an injection and deposit also in individuals with no kidney issues.

In vitro studies found it to be neurotoxic.

An Italian task force recommended that breastfeeding mothers precautionally avoid any contrast agent such as gadodiamide that has been associated with nephrogenic systemic fibrosis.

Society and culture 
Gadodiamide was suspended along with gadopentetic acid (Magnevist) by the European Medicines Agency in 2017.

References

External links 
 

MRI contrast agents
Organogadolinium compounds
Withdrawn drugs